Janeshwar Mishra Park is an urban park operating in Gomti Nagar in Lucknow, India.  It was named in memory of late politician Janeshwar Mishra from Samajwadi Party.

History
The chief minister of Uttar Pradesh, Akhilesh Yadav (session 2012-2017) laid the foundation stone of the park on 6 August 2012. The park was a dream project of SP chief Mulayam Singh Yadav who had asked his son and UP CM Akhilesh Yadav to dedicate a park in the name of Janeshwar Mishra. It was developed with a cost of 168 crores($276,026.668). The park was modeled with Hyde Park in London as an inspiration.

Features
The architectural and development blueprint has been drafted by the prestigious New Delhi-based School of Planning and Architecture. The park has a long meandering walkway. There is an exclusive cycle track running over with cycle parking facility. Also, there are jogging track that can be used by professional athletes.

The park boasts the following features:

 Green belt spread across the park.
 Lakes
 Sports centre and playground
 Gymnasium
 Cycle track
 Jogging track
 Theme park
 Lawns
 Gondola
 Water bodies recharged through rain water harvesting
 Entire park is solar powered

References

Buildings and structures in Lucknow
Monuments and memorials in Uttar Pradesh
Gardens in Lucknow
Urban public parks
2014 establishments in Uttar Pradesh